Mesak Settafet is a massive sandstone escarpment in southwest Libya. The outcropping is abundant in prehistoric rock art and stone tools, particularly at the Wadi Mathendous site.

Rock art
There are many distinctive and large prehistoric carvings at the Mesak Settafet escarpment, especially at Wadi Mathendous. The outcropping's exposed stones are covered in a dark varnish or patina containing minerals not currently present in the sandstone. The microns-thick patina of iron and manganese oxides were likely laid down on the rock when the area was much wetter, up to 5000 years ago. The majority of the rock carvings in the area were probably first scratched then ground, likely with water, to create a purposeful finish.

Rock tools
The Mesak Settafet is littered with stone tools from the Pleistocene and later ages. The researchers for the Libyan Department of Antiquities used this figure to call the escarpment the earliest evidence of an anthropogenic environment.

References

External links
 University of Cambridge article
 Phys.org article

Saharan rock art
Archaeological sites in Libya